Kari Barba (born July 10, 1960) is an American tattoo artist and painter from Minneapolis. Barba has been practicing art for over 40 years and is best known for her work for women within the tattoo industry. Barba is based in Long Beach, California. She is the owner of Outer Limits Tattoo, the oldest tattoo shop in the United States.

Background 
At 19 years old, Barba began her tattoo art career. In 1980, she moved from Minnesota to California to pursue tattooing full time. By 1983, she opened her first tattoo shop in Anaheim, California, Twilight Fantasy. From the beginning, Barba prioritized hiring female tattooers in order to diversify the notoriously male industry.

Since 1985, Barba has earned more than 500 awards for tattoo excellence. She won the Best Tattooist and also Best Overseas Tattooist twice. In 1985, she won Best Black and Grey Tattoo in Seattle, WA. In 1987, she won her first National Tattoo Associations' Tattooist of the Year.

Barba is known for her illustrative realism style. She is one of the first artists to tattoo in the style of color realism. Barba was one of the first tattoo artist to wear gloves and wrap her equipment, and therefore recognized for spearheading the sterile standards within in the tattoo industry.

Her accomplishments include the acquisition of a historically important tattoo shop and museum. In 2002, Barba acquired 22 S. Chestnut Pl in Long Beach. The location, originally opened by renowned tattooist Bert Grimm, has operated as a tattoo shop since 1927. The shop also houses a tattoo museum paying tribute to The Pike and artists past.

A silicone arm tattooed by Barba was featured in an exhibition at the Natural History Museum of Los Angeles County in 2018. Barba is regularly part of the jury of experts for the Mondial  du Tatouage in Paris, France.

Barba's 4th and final apprentice was tattooist Jenny Nguyen.

Exhibitions 
2021 "Art Under the Skin", Caixa Forum Museum, Madrid, Spain
2018 "Tattoo", Museum of Natural History, Los Angeles, California
2017 "Tattoo" Field Museum, Chicago, Illinois
2014 Tatoueurs Tatoués, Musée du quai Branly - Jacques Chirac Paris, France

Personal life 
Barba's son, Jeremiah Barba, is a tattooist and shop owner.

References

Further reading 
 Covered in Ink: Tattoos, Women, and the Politics of the Body https://www.tattoomediaink.com/t4w122/

External links 

 https://www.outerlimitstattoo.com/bio-of-kari-barba

1960 births
Living people
Artists from Minneapolis
American tattoo artists